Debt on our Doorstep is a UK-based campaign against extortionate credit lending and for fair financial services.  The campaign, founded in 1999, comprises not-for-profit and non-governmental organisations including Oxfam and the National Housing Federation. It scored a success in 2003 when it successfully pressed for a Competition Commission investigation into the UK 'Home Credit' or door-to-door lending market.  The subsequent inquiry, which completed in late 2006, found against the industry and estimated that around £75 million per year was being made by lenders as a result of a lack of price competition in the market.  Remedies, including compulsory data sharing to allow borrowers to build up credit scores and access cheaper alternatives, are due to be introduced in 2007.

More recently, the campaign has broadened out to include activity against a variety of 'predatory lenders' in the UK including payday loan lenders and rent-to-own shops, whilst also promoting local action to increase access to affordable credit following its 2005 report, Scaling Up for Financial Inclusion.

Founder member and Chair of Debt on our Doorstep, Damon Gibbons, also sits on the Organising Committee of the European Coalition for Responsible Credit, which has organised a series of conferences to promote debate and dialogue between consumer agencies and the financial services industry on issues including usury, responsibility, and fair access to financial services.

See also
Poverty industry

External links
 www.debt-on-our-doorstep.com
 Scaling Up for Financial Inclusion, March 2005

Social welfare charities based in the United Kingdom
Organizations established in 1999
Debt
1999 establishments in the United Kingdom